Emmett Goodwin was the Chief of Police of Chickasha, Oklahoma killed the night of February 1, 1909, in front of People's Store on Chickasha Avenue by Chickasha night police chief Will Thomas. 

Previously, Thomas had sought the position of police chief, but Goodwin was chosen. The night of Goodwin's murder, Thomas accused Goodwin of "letting the town run wide open", to which Goodwin replied that Thomas had just as much authority to correct the situation as Goodwin did. Thomas opened fire, shooting Goodwin in the head three times. One of the bullets penetrated Goodwin's head, killing him. Officer Joe Earl, Goodwin's brother-in-law, was with Officer Goodwin, was wounded by three shots from Thomas's gun, and returned fire. Thomas presented himself to the Chickasha police station. Thomas was tried and acquitted by a jury in June, 1909. 

Goodwin was survived by his wife Flora and seven children.

After the trial, Goodwin's wife moved away from Chickasha as she said she could not stand seeing her husband's murderer.

External links 
 Oklahoma Law Enforcement Memorial

Year of birth missing
1909 deaths
People from Chickasha, Oklahoma
American police chiefs
Male murder victims
People murdered in Oklahoma
Deaths by firearm in Oklahoma
Police officers from Oklahoma